Roman concrete, also called , was used in construction in ancient Rome. Like its modern equivalent, Roman concrete was based on a hydraulic-setting cement added to an aggregate. 

Many buildings and structures still standing today — such as bridges, reservoirs and aqueducts — were built with this material, which attests to both its versatility and its durability. Its strength was sometimes enhanced by the incorporation of pozzolanic ash where available (particularly in the Bay of Naples). The addition of ash prevented cracks from spreading. Recent research has shown that the incorporation of lime clasts allowed the concrete to self-repair cracks.

Roman concrete was in widespread use from about 150 BC; some scholars believe it was developed a century before that.

It was often used in combination with facings and other supports, and interiors were further decorated by stucco, fresco paintings, or coloured marble. Further innovative developments in the material — part of the so-called concrete revolution — contributed to structurally complicated forms. The most prominent example of these is the Pantheon dome, the world's largest and oldest unreinforced concrete dome.

Roman concrete differs from modern concrete in that the aggregates often included larger components; hence, it was laid rather than poured. Roman concretes, like any hydraulic concrete, were usually able to set underwater, which was useful for bridges and other waterside construction.

Historic references

Vitruvius, writing around 25 BC in his Ten Books on Architecture, distinguished types of materials appropriate for the preparation of lime mortars. For structural mortars, he recommended pozzolana ( in Latin), the volcanic sand from the beds of Pozzuoli, which are brownish-yellow-gray in colour in that area around Naples, and reddish-brown near Rome. Vitruvius specifies a ratio of 1 part lime to 3 parts pozzolana for mortar used in buildings and a 1:2 ratio for underwater work.

The Romans first used hydraulic concrete in coastal underwater structures, probably in the harbours around Baiae before the end of the 2nd century BC. The harbour of Caesarea is an example (22-15 BC) of the use of underwater Roman concrete technology on a large scale.

For rebuilding Rome after the fire in 64 AD which destroyed large portions of the city, Nero's new building code largely called for brick-faced concrete. This appears to have encouraged the development of the brick and concrete industries.

Material properties

Roman concrete, like any concrete, consists of an aggregate and hydraulic mortar, a binder mixed with water that hardens over time. The composition of the aggregate varied, and included pieces of rock, ceramic tile, lime clasts, and brick rubble from the remains of previously demolished buildings. In Rome, readily available tuff was often used as an aggregate.

Gypsum and quicklime were used as binders. Volcanic dusts, called pozzolana or "pit sand", were favoured where they could be obtained. Pozzolana makes the concrete more resistant to salt water than modern-day concrete. Pozzolanic mortar had a high content of alumina and silica. 

Recent research (2023) found that lime clasts — previously considered a sign of poor aggregation technique — react with water seeping into any cracks. This produces reactive calcium, which allows new calcium carbonate crystals to form and reseal the cracks. These lime clasts have a brittle structure that was most likely created in a "hot-mixing" technique with quicklime rather than traditional slaked lime, causing cracks to preferentially move through the lime clasts, thus potentially playing a critical role in the self-healing mechanism.

Concrete, and in particular, the hydraulic mortar responsible for its cohesion, was a type of structural ceramic whose utility derived largely from its rheological plasticity in the paste state. The setting and hardening of hydraulic cements derived from hydration of materials and the subsequent chemical and physical interaction of these hydration products. This differed from the setting of slaked lime mortars, the most common cements of the pre-Roman world. Once set, Roman concrete exhibited little plasticity, although it retained some resistance to tensile stresses.The setting of pozzolanic cements has much in common with setting of their modern counterpart, Portland cement. The high silica composition of Roman pozzolana cements is very close to that of modern cement to which blast furnace slag, fly ash, or silica fume have been added.  

The strength and longevity of Roman 'marine' concrete is understood to benefit from a reaction of seawater with a mixture of volcanic ash and quicklime to create a rare crystal called tobermorite, which may resist fracturing. As seawater percolated within the tiny cracks in the Roman concrete, it reacted with phillipsite naturally found in the volcanic rock and created aluminous tobermorite crystals. The result is a candidate for "the most durable building material in human history". In contrast, modern concrete exposed to saltwater deteriorates within decades.

The Roman concrete at the Tomb of Caecilia Metella is another variation higher in potassium that triggered changes that "reinforce interfacial zones and potentially contribute to improved mechanical performance".

Seismic technology

For an environment as prone to earthquakes as the Italian peninsula, interruptions and internal constructions within walls and domes created discontinuities in the concrete mass. Portions of the building could then shift slightly when there was movement of the earth to accommodate such stresses, enhancing the overall strength of the structure. It was in this sense that bricks and concrete were flexible. It may have been precisely for this reason that, although many buildings sustained serious cracking from a variety of causes, they continue to stand to this day. 

Another technology used to improve the strength and stability of concrete was its gradation in domes.

Modern use
Scientific studies of Roman concrete since 2010 have attracted both media and industry attention. Because of its unusual durability, longevity and lessened environmental footprint, corporations and municipalities are starting to explore the use of Roman-style concrete in North America. This involves replacing the volcanic ash with coal fly ash that has similar properties. Proponents say that concrete made with fly ash can cost up to 60% less because it requires less cement. It also has a reduced environmental footprint due to its lower cooking temperature and much longer lifespan. Usable examples of Roman concrete exposed to harsh marine environments have been found to be 2000 years old with little or no wear.

In 2013, the University of California Berkeley published an article that described for the first time the mechanism by which the suprastable calcium-aluminium-silicate-hydrate compound binds the material together. During its production, less carbon dioxide is released into the atmosphere than any modern concrete production process. Its disadvantages include the longer drying time and somewhat lower strength than modern concrete, despite its greater durability. It is no coincidence that the walls of Roman buildings are thicker than those of modern buildings. However, Roman concrete was still gaining its strength for several decades after construction had been completed, which is not the case with modern concretes.

See also

Literature

References

External links
 
 
 

Ancient Roman architecture
Concrete
Concrete buildings and structures
Building materials
Masonry
Pavements
Sculpture materials
Ancient inventions
Architecture in Italy
Architectural history
Lost inventions